The McLaren MP4-12C, later known simply as the McLaren 12C, is a sports car that was designed and manufactured by McLaren Automotive. It was the first ever production car wholly designed and built by McLaren, and their first production road car produced since the McLaren F1, which ended production in 1998. The car's final design was unveiled in September 2009 and was launched in mid-2011.

The car makes use of Formula 1-sourced technologies such as "brake steer", where the inside rear wheel is braking during fast cornering to reduce understeer. Power is transmitted to the wheels through a seven-speed dual-clutch transmission Seamless-Shift gearbox (SSG) manufactured by Graziano Trasmissioni. 

A convertible version of the car called the MP4-12C Spider, renamed the 12C Spider in 2012, was also available. In February 2014, McLaren announced the related 650S, with revised bodywork, upgraded engine and other technical improvements. In April 2014, McLaren announced the end of production of the 12C.

Development
McLaren started developing the car in 2007 and secretly purchased a Ferrari 360 to use as a test mule. The mule called MV1 was used to test the 3.8-litre twin-turbocharged V8 engine.  The car also featured side vents for additional cooling which were later incorporated in the final production model.  Later in the year, the company purchased an Ultima GTR to test the braking system and suspension components, that mule was called the MV2. The space frame and body of that car were modified in order to accommodate the new components. Later, a third prototype was developed which was another Ferrari 360 dubbed the MV3 which was used to test the exhaust system. McLaren then built two prototypes themselves called CP1 and CP2 incorporating the Carbon Monocell monocoque which were used for testing the heat management system and performance. The final car was unveiled to the public on 9 September 2009 before the company's launch in 2010.

Specifications

Design
In 2008, McLaren hired Frank Stephenson as design director for their reborn production car project.

As with the McLaren F1, carbon fibre is used extensively in the vehicle to minimise weight. The MP4-12C weighs  dry.

The chassis is based around a F1 style one-piece carbon fibre tub, called the Carbon MonoCell, weighing only . The MonoCell is made in a single pressing by using a set of patented processes, using Bi-Axial and Tri-Axial carbon fibre multiaxial fabrics produced by Formax UK Ltd. with the MonoCell manufactured by Carbo Tech in Salzburg, Austria. This has reduced the time required to produce a MonoCell from 3,000 hours for the F1 and 500 hours for the Mercedes-Benz SLR McLaren, to 4 hours for the MP4-12C.

The car has a conventional two side-by-side seating arrangement, unlike its predecessor the F1 which featured a three-seat formation (front centre, two behind either side). To make up for this, however, the car's central console is narrower than in other cars, seating the driver closer to the centre. Interior trim and materials can be specified in asymmetric configuration – known as "Driver Zone".

Suspension
The McLaren MP4-12C uses a unique hydraulic configuration to suspend the vehicle as opposed to more traditional coil springs, dampers and anti-roll bars. What McLaren has called "ProActive Chassis Control," the system consists of an array of high and low pressure valves interconnected from both left to right and front to back, and the typical anti-roll bars were omitted entirely. When high pressure meets high pressure under roll conditions, stiffness results; and subsequently when high pressure meets low under heave and warp, more give is allowed, ultimately providing a firmer, competent suspension setup in spirited driving, and a very plush, compliant and comfortable ride when moving at slower, constant speeds.

Engine

The car is powered by the M838T  twin-turbo V8 engine, designed and developed by McLaren, Ilmor and Ricardo. The design of the engine is based on a racing engine which was designed and developed by Tom Walkinshaw Racing for the IndyCar Series but never raced. However, other than the  bore, little of that engine remains in the M838T. It has a redline of 8,500 rpm, with 80% of torque available at just 2,000 rpm. When first announced, McLaren claimed that it would have a higher horsepower to carbon dioxide emission ratio than any internal-combustion engine available at the time.

McLaren announced a small number of improvements to become available in October 2012, with the option to be retrofitted to existing cars free of charge. The engine power was increased to  while the proclaimed  emissions remain at 279 g/km. This change in engine power became a standard feature with the 2013 model.

The M838T engine is manufactured for McLaren at the Ricardo Shoreham Technical Centre in West Sussex.

Transmission

The engine is connected to a seven-speed automatic dual-clutch gearbox made by Graziano Oerlikon. Dubbed the "Seamless Shift Gearbox" or SSG, the gearbox features a system dubbed "Pre-Cog" that allows the driver to preselect the next gear by lightly tapping the paddle.

Performance

The Coupe (in reality) can do .

Naming convention
The name's former prefix 'MP4' has been the chassis designation for all McLaren Formula 1 cars since 1981. 'MP4' stands for McLaren Project 4 (formerly known as Marlboro Project 4) as a result of the merger between Ron Dennis' Project 4 organization with McLaren. The '12' refers to McLaren's internal Vehicle Performance Index through which it rates key performance criteria both for competitors and for its own cars. The criteria combine power, weight, emissions, and aerodynamic efficiency. The coalition of all these values delivers an overall performance index that has been used as a benchmark throughout the car's development. The 'C' refers to Carbon, highlighting the application of carbon fibre technology to the future range of McLaren sports cars.

MP4-12C shares its name with the MP4/12 Formula 1 car that raced in the 1997 season.  This car featured a second brake pedal discovered by photographers to counter understeer on the exit of the corners by selecting the inside rear wheel, similar to the computer controlled "brake steer" system of the MP4-12C.

In the end of 2012, the name of the MP4-12C was reduced to 12C – that name is usually used when referring to the coupe. The open-top version now being referred to as the 12C Spider.

Production
Produced at the new £50M McLaren Production Centre, which is located next to the existing award-winning McLaren Technology Centre in Surrey, the building is designed to serve as the future production site of McLaren Automotive's road cars. British Prime Minister David Cameron officially opened the building on 18 November 2011.

All of the major components were produced by external contractors, with only final assembly, paint and inspection / shipping occurring at the McLaren Production Centre. Final assembly started with the MonoCell, around which all components were then placed and fitted.

Reception
On 10 July 2011, the MP4-12C set the second fastest lap around Top Gear test track, posting a time of 1 minute and 16.2 seconds. The car was developed and tested by McLaren on the Top Gear test track as part of their product development, long before its appearance on the show. It was 1.1 seconds slower than the Ariel Atom 500 and 2.4 seconds slower than the Pagani Huayra.

The MP4-12C lapped the Nürburgring in 7 minutes and 28 seconds.

The MP4-12C won the Middle East "Car of the Year" Award as "Best Supercar" in 2012 and overall "Car of the Year" at the Middle East Motor Awards the same year.

Spider

The 12C Spider is a convertible version of the MP4-12C with a retractable hardtop. Because the coupe was designed from the outset with a convertible version in mind, no additional strengthening was needed for the Spider and it weighs only  more than the coupe. Meanwhile, the dihedral doors of the coupé are retained.

MP4-12C HS 
In March 2012, McLaren released pictures of five 12C HS taken in front of the McLaren Technology Center. The HS stands for High Sport. The 12C HS has different wheels and revised aerodynamic features inspired from the 12C GT3 such as a revised front end and rear bumper, larger vents and diffuser and a modified rear wing. Power was also increased by 75 horsepower. Mclaren only made 10 units of the MP4-12C HS. In January 2016, a 12C HS painted in F1 Vodafone Racing Team colours reportedly commissioned by Ron Dennis was offered for sale at Mecum's Kissimmee auction with 203 miles. It had an estimate of $1,300,000 – $1,600,000 and didn't sell. The same F1 Vodafone Racing Team was offered again in January 2017 at Mecum's Kissimmee auction with an estimate of $950,000 – $1,200,000 where it still didn't sell.

McLaren X-1
The McLaren X-1 is a one-off sports car based on the McLaren 12C and built by McLaren Special Operations (MSO). It was displayed at the 2012 Pebble Beach Concours d'Elegance. According to Paul MacKenzie, MSO Programme Director, the X-1 has been developed for the past three years. To style the X-1, McLaren used ideas from a 1961 Facel Vega, a 1953 Chrysler D'Elegance Ghia, a 1959 Buick Electra, a 1939 Mercedes-Benz 540K and a 1971 Citroën SM.

Motorsports

GT3

In December 2010, McLaren announced that they would produce a small number of MP4-12C cars in order for them to compete in the FIA Group GT3. McLaren stated that they would provide maintenance for the cars and begin racing in 2012 with the CRS Racing team. The MP4-12C was the first car to compete in sportscar racing for the company since the F1 GTR. It received its début with a single car entry for the Spa Francorchamps round of the British GT championship. This was followed by a three car entry in the 2011 Spa 24 Hours. Another car was also entered in the GT cup of the 2011 Macau Grand Prix, driven by Danny Watts.

In March 2012, McLaren readied 25 MP4-12C GT3 cars for a full racing season in the 2012 FIA GT1 World Championship, and its GT drivers tested the car on its Dunsfold test track, the same test track as used in the Top Gear BBC television show. McLaren released several promotional videos for the MP4-12C in the lead up to the racing season, including one of Formula 1 star Lewis Hamilton driving the car at locations in the U.S.

Compared to the road car, the MP4-12C GT3 produces less power with only  due to homologation. The car features a bespoke six-speed gearbox that is  lighter than the road car's seven-speed, developed with Ricardo. The steering wheel is sourced from the McLaren MP4-24 Formula 1 car.

The car took its first victories in the world at the two races of the Circuito de Navarra round of the 2012 FIA GT1 World Championship season being run by Hexis Racing.

Marketing
Tag Heuer produced a limited (1,000 units) series of Carrera MP4-12C Chronograph wrist watch inspired by the MP4-12C sports car. The watch was unveiled in 2011 TAG Heuer Mastering Speed Exhibition at Halle Secheron in Geneva.

References

External links

 Official McLaren Automotive website

12C
Coupés
Hardtop convertibles
Rear mid-engine, rear-wheel-drive vehicles
Sports cars
Cars introduced in 2011
Cars discontinued in 2014